Will Nally (13 December 1914 – 4 August 1965) was a British Labour and Co-operative Party politician.

Nally joined the Labour League of Youth, and served as president of its Manchester district from 1930 to 1934. He then worked as a journalist, and served as a gunner in the Royal Artillery, then as a war correspondent during World War II. He was elected as the Member of Parliament for the Bilston constituency at the 1945 general election.

Nally stood down at the 1955 general election, citing the problem of splitting his time between his constituency in Wolverhampton, Parliament at Westminster, and his family home in Manchester. He was nominated for selection for the seat of Manchester Gorton but was not short-listed.

References

1914 births
1965 deaths
Labour Co-operative MPs for English constituencies
UK MPs 1945–1950
UK MPs 1950–1951
UK MPs 1951–1955
British Army personnel of World War II
Royal Artillery soldiers
British war correspondents
War correspondents of World War II